Love Lessons is the third studio album from American neotraditionalist country artist Tracy Byrd. It produced the singles "Love Lessons," "Walking to Jerusalem," "4 to 1 in Atlanta," and "Heaven in My Woman's Eyes," all of which charted on the Billboard country music charts between 1995 and 1996. The title track was the only single of these four to reach Top Ten on that chart.

Track listing

Personnel
Tracy Byrd – lead vocals
Johnny Lee Carpenter – fiddle
Stuart Duncan – fiddle
Buddy Emmons – pedal steel guitar
Paul Franklin – pedal steel guitar, pedabro
Liana Manis – background vocals
Brent Mason – electric guitar, gut string guitar
Steve Nathan – piano, organ, synthesizer, Wurlitzer
Mark Nesler – background vocals
Mickey Raphael – harmonica
John Wesley Ryles – background vocals
Billy Joe Walker, Jr. – electric guitar, acoustic guitar
Biff Watson – acoustic guitar
Lonnie Wilson – drums, tambourine, vibraslap
Glenn Worf – bass guitar, upright bass

Charts

Weekly charts

Year-end charts

Certifications

References

1995 albums
Tracy Byrd albums
MCA Records albums
Albums produced by Tony Brown (record producer)